Gigantic was a free-to-play strategic third-person shooter video game developed by the independent game studio Motiga and published by Perfect World Entertainment. The game focused on team-based action combat with heroes battling alongside a massive guardian. Players must protect their guardian along with their team and attempt to destroy the opposing team and their guardian.

Developers had been talking about the game since 2013, codenamed "Raid" at the time. Gigantic was announced officially on July 15, 2014. Shortly after, on July 24 of the same year, the pre alpha began. The game's beta was launched in August 2015. Gigantic was fully released on Steam, Arc, Xbox One, and Windows 10 on July 20, 2017.

On January 31, 2018, it was announced that further development for Gigantic had ceased and that the game's servers would be discontinued on July 31, 2018, the day that Gigantic servers officially shut down.

Gameplay

Teams of five players unite along with a magical behemoth known as a Guardian with the ultimate goal to destroy the opposing team and their Guardian. There are 20 playable Heroes for players to choose from, all with a wide variety of abilities.

To destroy the other Guardian, Heroes have to gather power for theirs. You can kill enemies to get power. But most of the power is collected from the land itself. There are points on the map where Power will appear. You can see when and where power is on the minimap. It takes a while to collect power, so instead you can summon creatures on your half of the map. All the different creatures have different strategic abilities. Creatures also collect power faster. But if a creature gets killed, it also grants power. Killing a Hero or a baby creature grants 10 power, killing an adult creature or collecting power grants 20. If your Guardian has 100 power, you may attack. If your Guardian rampages, you have 20 seconds to get to the opponent Guardian on the other side of the map. An obvious weak point will appear on the forehead, which should be hit in order to wound the Guardian. If you manage to deal enough damage, the Guardian gets wounded. If you do not deal damage fast enough, the rampage ends and a new race for power begins.

When the opponent rampages, you have 20 seconds to get to your own Guardian. All the power you've gathered so far will become a breakable shield. The enemy Heroes will try to deal a wound, so protect your Guardian to prevent this. You can kill enemies, which will grant you power and strengthen your shield. The opponent's kills extend the time the opponent can damage your Guardian.

The first team that deals three wounds wins.

Controversies 
Following the game's release, which suffered multiple delays, it was heavily criticized for being a copy of Overwatch, a Blizzard Entertainment game that was announced on November 7, 2014 and came out two years later on May 24, 2016. Alleged plagiarism claims against Gigantic remained throughout the game's short life, despite it being officially announced several months before Overwatch and information about the game leaking in mid-2013, in the same way that the Overwatch community accused Paladins later, but unlike the latter the discussion did not become as popular due to how small the Gigantic community was at the time.

Reception

Gigantic received "generally positive" reviews, according to review aggregator Metacritic.

References

External links
 

2017 video games
Products and services discontinued in 2018
Free-to-play video games
Hero shooters
Multiplayer online battle arena games
Multiplayer online games
Multiplayer video games
Third-person shooters
Unreal Engine games
Video games developed in the United States
Windows games
Xbox One games
Xbox Play Anywhere games
Inactive multiplayer online games